The World Wrestling Association (WWA) (Asociación Mundial de Lucha Libre in Spanish) is a lucha libre promotion based in the Tijuana-area of Mexico. It was founded in 1986 by Benjamin Mora Jr.. It featured some of Mexico's best luchadores at the time, such as Rey Mysterio Jr., La Parka and Juventud Guerrera, during the late 1980s and early 1990s and was also featured on American television via the Fox Sports en Español channel.

Although inactive during the late 1990s, during which time much of its roster had left to compete in World Championship Wrestling and international promotions, the World Wrestling Association resumed operations in 2004.

Championships

Footnotes
1 Although the official WWA Junior Heavyweight title is currently being defended in Mexico, A disputed Branch of the title has surfaced in Japan.

Roster
The roster included some widely popular wrestlers such as:
L.A. Park
Super Parka
Blue Panther
El Hijo del Santo
Rey Misterio Sr.
Rey Mysterio Jr.
Perro Aguayo Jr.
Blue Demon Jr.
Nicho el Millonario
Juventud Guerrera
Pentagon Black
The Patriot
Racing Dawg
Espectro Jr.
Scorpio Jr.
Tiger Jeet Singh
Alcatraz, Backstage interviewer (also Benjamin Moras Brother)
Armando Munoz, Backstage interviewer
Extreme Tiger
Tinieblas Jr.
Mil Mascaras
Rayo de Jalisco
Perro Aguayo
Brazo de Plata (Super Porky)
Kayra
Lola Gonzales
Shocker
Vampiro

On DVD
In 2006 World Wrestling Organization was released on DVD. It features 25 matches from The WWA broadcasts that were featured on Fox sports en Espanol.

See also

List of professional wrestling promotions in Mexico

References

External links
 WWA Title Histories

Mexican professional wrestling promotions

Sports in Tijuana